The 1996 WPA World Nine-ball Championship was a professional pool championship that took place in 1996 in Borlänge, Sweden. The event was won by Germany's Ralf Souquet, who defeated Sweden's Tom Storm in the final 11–1. Defending champion Oliver Ortmann was defeated in the semi-finals 13-8 by Storm.

Knockout stages
The following is the results from the quarter-finals. Players competing had progressed through the earlier knockout round. Players in bold denote match winners. Matches were race-to-13- until the final match was race-to-11- due to televising purposes.

References

1996
WPA World Nine-ball Championship
International sports competitions hosted by Sweden